The Sharon Scranage espionage scandal involved the passing of classified information from Sharon Scranage, a clerk with the Central Intelligence Agency, to Michael Soussoudis, an intelligence officer with the Ghanaian Provisional National Defence Council.

Sharon Scranage
Sharon Marie Scranage was born October 1955. In May 1976, Scranage joined the CIA as a clerk-stenographer.

Michael Soussoudis
Michael Agbotui Soussoudis  was born in April 1946 in Accra, Ghana. He was brought up in West Germany and went to college in New York City, where he also was married and divorced to an American woman. He returned to Ghana after college, and he was described as leading a "playboy lifestyle", due to his party lifestyle and friendship with American women, he was described as "more American than African." As an adult, he was described as a handsome, debonair character. At the time of the scandal, Soussoudis was a Ghanaian intelligence officer with permanent residence in the United States.

Involvement with Sharon Scranage
Soussoudis formed a romantic relationship with CIA employee Sharon Scranage sometime between May 27, 1983, and October 1984, eventually getting her to confide confidential information to him. The affair reportedly lasted 18 months. She claimed that she had informed the CIA station chief in Ghana of the relationship and was told only to "be careful." Soussoudis was assigned to seduce Scranage and solicit US intelligence from her. Scranage was working in Ghana in the role of operations support assistant at the time. Soussoudis obtained from Scranage the identities of Ghanaian citizens who were spying for the CIA, as well as plans for a coup against the Ghanaian government by dissidents. Soussoudis then passed the information to Ghanaian intelligence chief Kojo Tsikata. 

The first indications of the affair occurred in 1983 when an Office of Security officer was at Scranage's home for dinner and noticed a picture of a man, later identified as Soussoudis on the vanity of her mirror. The picture showed a shirtless Soussoudis with blankets pulled up to his chest. Upon Scranage's return to the U.S. she failed a routine polygraph test, and further questioning led to the CIA uncovering how much information Soussoudis had obtained from her. American authorities claimed that Scranage had handed Soussoudis "sensitive documents and the names of virtually everyone working for the C.I.A. in the country". Soussoudis is an example of employing a successful honey trap to gain classified information.

Arrest and conviction of Scranage
Scranage is said to have come under suspicion when, upon her return to the United States in 1985, she failed a routine polygraph test. After an FBI investigation, Scranage cooperated with the authorities, and assisted in the arrest of Soussoudis. Soussoudis was later released in exchange for the Ghanaians arrested as CIA spies, who were deported to the United States and stripped of their Ghanaian citizenship.

Scranage was charged with espionage and with breaching the Intelligence Identities Protection Act. She pleaded guilty to three of the eighteen charges against her, with the others being dropped. Late in 1985, she was sentenced to five years in prison, later reduced to two years.
She ultimately served eight months of the original five-year sentence.

Arrest and conviction of Soussoudis
After Scranage's relationship with Soussoudis was discovered, Scranage agreed to help the FBI lure him to the United States. While on leave back in the US while Soussoudis was also there, Scranage contacted him and asked to meet at a motel in northern Virginia, where Soussoudis was arrested and charged with eight counts of espionage. During a closed court hearing, he was sentenced to 20 years in prison, but he was eventually traded in exchange for eight of the agents whose identities he had helped compromise in Ghana. He was released on condition that he quickly leave the United States. On December 3, 1985, he returned to Ghana and was greeted by thousands of cheering citizens.

Fallout and consequences
The information Soussoudis obtained from Sharon Scranage led to the arrest of eight Ghanaian citizens who had been spying for the CIA. They received sentences ranging from 25 years in prison with hard labor to life imprisonment. The US government believed that another CIA informant in Ghana who had been exposed was killed. The intelligence also uncovered a planned coup by Godfrey Osei, of which there are allegations that the CIA supported. The coup was allegedly already in motion with a boat carrying six tons of heavy weapons when the crew rebelled. That led to the boat of arms and mercenaries returning to Brazil and the mercenaries being arrested, and later breaking out of prison and making their way back to the United States. Among the eight arrested in Ghana included Naval Captain Oppong, Colonel Bray, Abel Edusei, Adu Gyamfi, and Major John Kwaku Awuakye. They constituted some of the most high-ranking informants that the CIA had in the  government of Jerry Rawlings. These eight CIA spies were stripped of their Ghanaian citizenship before being deported to the United States, and being relocated in the Virginia, D.C., area. According to FBI affidavits and CIA intelligence declassified in 2011, Ghanaian intelligence chief Kojo Tsikata passed intelligence provided by Scranage to Cuba, Libya, and East Germany.

See also
 John Kiriakou, another former CIA employee later charged under the 1982 Intelligence Identities Protection Act

References

Espionage scandals and incidents
Ghana–United States relations
1985 in Ghana
1985 in the United States
1985 crimes in Ghana
1985 crimes in the United States